Philippine Amusement and Gaming Corporation (PAGCOR)  is a government-owned and controlled corporation established through the Presidential Decree 1869. PAGCOR is the Philippines' largest contributor of revenue to the government after the Bureau of Internal Revenue and the Bureau of Customs.

PAGCOR is under the Office of the President of the Philippines.

History
The Corporation was created during the Martial Law years by virtue of a Presidential Decree (PD1067-A) issued by then President Ferdinand E. Marcos in response to calls for the Philippine Government to put a stop to the growing proliferation of illegal casino operations in various parts of the country then.

After its establishment, PAGCOR entered into a contract with Philippine Casino Operators Corporation (PCOC) for the operation of the floating casino in Manila Bay in 1977. However, after the floating casino was gutted by fire in 1979, PAGCOR shifted its focus to land-based casinos and entered into another contract with PCOC for the management of a casino at the Provident International and Resources Corporation (PIRC) building on Imelda Avenue, Parañaque City, Metro Manila, Philippines. Then, under Presidential Decree 1869, decreed in 1983, it was mandated to act as the sole government corporation conducting and establishing gaming pools and casinos in the country. In 1986, it was re-established and reorganized by Philippine President Corazon C. Aquino as a New PAGCOR to help raise funds for the government; Norberto Quisumbing was appointed as its first chairman, followed by the former Development Bank of the Philippines Chair Alicia LL. Reyes as its Chair and CEO. Reyes was succeeded by Ephraim Genuino under the appointment by Philippine President Gloria Macapagal Arroyo in 2001.

The firm operates its own casinos and several VIP slot clubs in major cities across the country. It also oversees and regulates privately owned casinos, more than 180 bingo parlors, as well as e-games cafes across the country. The company employs more than 11,000 workers. In June 2007, PAGCOR gained from a piece of legislation, Republic Act 9487, which granted the state-run gaming firm, then under the leadership of Chairman Genuino, another 25 years to regulate and operate games of chance, to issue licenses, and to enter into joint venture, management, or investment agreements with private entities for the Entertainment City in the Manila Bay area, Parañaque, and in Newport City, Pasay, in particular. Chairman Genuino successfully attracted investors to the project to put up Las Vegas-style integrated resorts. Two integrated resorts opened on November 1, 2014.

On July 13, 2018, PAGCOR announced the appointment of Attorney Angeline Papica-Entienza as the head of the agency's Gaming Licensing and Development Department and as the assistant vice president of the corporation.

List of chairpersons
Norberto B. Quisumbing (1986)
Alicia L. Reyes (1987–2001)
Efraim C. Genuino (2001–2010)
Cristino L. Naguiat Jr. (2010 – June 2016)
Andrea D. Domingo (July 2016 – June 2022)
Alejandro H. Tengco (August 2022–present)

See also
Casino Filipino

References

Gambling companies of the Philippines
Government-owned and controlled corporations of the Philippines
Companies based in Manila
Establishments by Philippine presidential decree